The "GW525" is a mobile phone manufactured by LG Electronics.

Main Features 
The LG GW525 is a basic slider phone.  The key features are:
QWERTY keypad
2.8" Touch Screen
Accelerometer
3 Megapixel camera
WAP
Video Calling
Speaker Phone (Handsfree)
2.0 Java Support
In-built Games
Customisable widgets
Calendar and Organiser
Alarm
Customisable Wallpaper
Downloadable Ringtones & Wallpapers

In The Box
When you buy the phone you should get:
LG GW525 Mobile Phone
LG Approved GW525 950mAh Li-Ion Battery
A/C Charger
USB Data Cable
LG GW525 PC-Sync Software CD
Handsfree

Technical Specifications 
Here are the technical specifications of this phone.

Carrier Support
Theoretically, the phone should work on any network, if you unlock it.
However, according to the phones website, the phone will work on All Phones, Optus and TeleChoice only.

Operating Frequency
GSM: 850/900/1500/1900
UMTS: 900/2100/HSPDA Speed 7.2Mbit/s

Dimensions
Height: 106.5mm
Width: 53mm
Thickness: 15.9mm
Weight: 125.5g

Screen
Size:2.8" Touch Screen
Colours: 262k
Pixels:240x400 (Width x Height)

Memory
Internal: 40 Megabytes
Expandable: Yes, up to 8 Gigabytes MicroSD
Phone Book: Up to 1000 Entries

Messaging
The phone can send normal SMS text messages with T9 (predictive text), as well as MMS, with Video MMS capabilities
E-Mail: POP3 and EAS

Camera
The phone has a 3 MegaPixel camera with 2 times digital zoom.

Media
Music: Audio formats include MP3, AAC, AAC+ and AAC++
Video: Video formats include H.263, H.264 and MPEG4
The phone also comes with an FM radio, like most other phones the headset that comes with the phone is needed.

Battery
The battery that comes with the phone is 950mAh Li-Ion, with 400 hours of stand-by time and 4.5 hours of talk time.

Connectivity
The phone comes with Bluetooth and a USB 2.0 connector for PC-Sync.

See also
 LG Electronics
 LG Electronics Australia

References

LG Electronics mobile phones